William Henry Naylor (23 November 1919 – January 1989), known early in his career as Bill Barke, was an English professional footballer who played as an inside forward in the Football League for Leyton Orient, Crystal Palace and Brentford. He top-scored for Crystal Palace during the 1946–47 season.

Career statistics

References

1919 births
English footballers
English Football League players
Brentford F.C. players
Footballers from Sheffield
Association football inside forwards
Crystal Palace F.C. players
Leyton Orient F.C. players
1989 deaths

Weymouth F.C. players